Elez Isufi (1861 – 29 December 1924) was an Albanian nationalist figure and guerrilla fighter.

Biography
Elez Isufi was born in the village of Sllovë in the Dibër region, was son of Isuf Ndreu. He and his guerrilla band resisted Serb forces in 1912. A close ally of Bajram Curri, Isufi led an uprising in Dibra on 15 August 1921 to free the region from Serb forces. The fighting continued up to December 1921.

He was involved in a further uprising on 1 March 1922 against the regime of Ahmet Zogu, and his Dibran fighters were able to cross the mountains and advance to Tirana. They reached the northeastern neighborhoods of the capital, went into skirmishes with the government forces led by Prenk Pervizi and withdrew only after the intervention of British diplomat Harry Eyres. They were first given death sentence by the military court and later received amnesty.

He took the side of Fan Noli during the Democratic Revolution and was killed by Yugoslav troops at the end of 1924 during the insurgence for overthrowing Nolis' government.

References

People from Dibër (municipality)
19th-century Albanian military personnel
20th-century Albanian military personnel
1861 births
1924 deaths
Albanian nationalists
Albanians in North Macedonia
People from Scutari vilayet
People from Manastir vilayet